Kilty is a surname. Notable people with the surname include:

Augustus Kilty (1807–1879), United States Navy officer who served during the Civil War
Dovilė Kilty (née Dzindzaletaitė; born 1993), Lithuanian track and field athlete
Jerome Kilty (born 1922), American actor and playwright
Mark Kilty (born 1981), former English professional football defender who played 23 league games
Richard Kilty (born 1989), British sprinter
William Kilty (1757–1821), United States federal judge

See also
USS Kilty (DD-137), Wickes class destroyer in the United States Navy
Willie Cameron (1883–1958), Scottish football player and manager known by the nickname 'Kilty'